The 2011 Karuizawa International Curling Championship was held from January 26-30 at the SCAP Karuizawa Arena in Karuizawa, Japan. The bonspiel featured eight men's and women's teams (five foreign teams and three Japanese teams) playing in a round robin format. The top four teams of each gender played in a single-elimination round to determine the winners.

Men's

Teams

Standings

Round-robin results

Draw 1
Wednesday, January 26, 13:00

Draw 2
Wednesday, January 26, 16:15

Draw 3
Wednesday, January 26, 19:30

Draw 4
Thursday, January 27, 9:00

Draw 5
Thursday, January 27, 12:15

Draw 6
Thursday, January 27, 15:30

Draw 7
Thursday, January 27, 18:45

Draw 8
Friday, January 28, 9:00

Draw 9
Friday, January 28, 12:15

Draw 10
Friday, January 28, 15:30

Draw 11
Friday, January 28, 18:45

Draw 12
Saturday, January 29, 8:00

Draw 13
Saturday, January 29, 11:15

Draw 14
Saturday, January 29, 14:30

Playoffs

Semifinals
Sunday, January 30, 9:00

Gold Medal Final
Sunday, January 30, 13:00

Bronze Medal Final
Sunday, January 30, 13:00

Women's

Teams

Standings

Round-robin results

Draw 1
Wednesday, January 26, 13:00

Draw 2
Wednesday, January 26, 16:15

Draw 3
Wednesday, January 26, 19:30

Draw 4
Thursday, January 27, 9:00

Draw 5
Thursday, January 27, 12:15

Draw 6
Thursday, January 27, 15:30

Draw 7
Thursday, January 27, 18:45

Draw 8
Friday, January 28, 9:00

Draw 9
Friday, January 28, 12:15

Draw 10
Friday, January 28, 15:30

Draw 11
Friday, January 28, 18:45

Draw 12
Saturday, January 29, 8:00

Draw 13
Saturday, January 29, 11:15

Draw 14
Saturday, January 29, 14:30

Tiebreaker

Playoffs

Semifinals
Sunday, January 30, 9:00

Gold Medal Final
Sunday, January 30, 13:00

Bronze Medal Final
Sunday, January 30, 13:00

External links
Karuizawa Int'l Curling Championship Home Page

2011 in curling